Loch Bràigh Horrisdale is a small, irregular shaped, freshwater loch in Wester Ross, in the north west of Scotland.

An in-river hydro-electric scheme down-stream of the loch has been proposed.  As a result of this, an environmental assessment of the fish and fish habitat of the loch and its outflow was commissioned. The assessment was reported in 2014. A full EIA planning application for the 2MW scheme was lodged with Highland Council by Three Lochs Hydro Ltd on 28 July 2016.

The loch was surveyed on 6 August 1902 by T.N. Johnston and John Hewitt and later charted as part of the Sir John Murray's  Bathymetrical Survey of Fresh-Water Lochs of Scotland 1897-1909.

References

See also 
 List of lochs in Scotland

Braigh Horrisdale
Braigh